Francisco Javier Martín Gil Ortiz (born 29 May 1963) is a Mexican politician from the Institutional Revolutionary Party. From 2009 to 2012 he served as Deputy of the LXI Legislature of the Mexican Congress representing Tamaulipas, and previously served as the municipal president of Altamira.

References

1963 births
Living people
Politicians from Tamaulipas
Institutional Revolutionary Party politicians
21st-century Mexican politicians
Municipal presidents in Tamaulipas
Deputies of the LXI Legislature of Mexico
Members of the Chamber of Deputies (Mexico) for Tamaulipas